Dietrich Roache (born 6 July 2001) is an Australian rugby sevens player. Roache was a member of the Australian men's rugby seven's squad at the Tokyo 2020 Olympics. The team came third in their pool and then lost to Fiji 19-0 in the quarterfinal. Roache plays club rugby union for Western Sydney Two Blues.

Youth
Born of Samoan descent from his father, Roache initially played rugby league for his school, Patrician Brothers' College, Fairfield. Whilst there, he was a part of the Patrician Brothers rugby league team that won the NRL Schoolboy Cup. Roache is a Roman Catholic.

Career
Though his father and uncle played rugby for the former Parramatta Two Blues, Roache did not start playing club rugby until 2018. This came after getting a free ticket to the Sydney Sevens in 2018. He gained a reputation as a fast player, being able to run a time of 4.59 seconds over 40 metres. This matched the time of Trae Williams who missed selection for the Australian Olympic team for the 2020 Olympic Games as a result. He was selected for the New South Wales Waratahs' Junior under-18 team and part of their development programme. In 2019, he played for Australia at the World Rugby School Sevens and a year later was signed by Rugby Australia to their sevens programme.

In 2021, when he was selected for the Australia national rugby sevens team for their 2020 Olympics rugby sevens tournament, he was the youngest member of the team and was given responsibility for taking care of the team's mascot Wally. This followed on from Henry Hutchison at the 2016 Summer Olympics where Wally was kidnapped by players from the Sweden women's national football team for 24 hours.

Roache competed for Australia at the 2022 Rugby World Cup Sevens in Cape Town.

References

External links
 

2001 births
Living people
Male rugby sevens players
Olympic rugby sevens players of Australia
Rugby sevens players at the 2020 Summer Olympics
Parramatta Two Blues players
Australian Roman Catholics
Australian sportspeople of Samoan descent
Sportsmen from New South Wales
21st-century Australian people
Rugby sevens players at the 2022 Commonwealth Games